The ATR.1 Certificate is a customs document used in trade between EU members and Turkey, to benefit from cheaper rates of duty. The legal basis for the use of the certificate is the EU-Turkey Customs Union. It is important to remember that not all products are included in the customs union. Products not included in the customs union are steel & coal and some agricultural products. Many of these are instead included in the EU-Turkey FTA.

It is also worthwhile to note that the ATR.1 certificate is not a certificate of origin, but rather a status certificate. It therefore certifies that the product has been put in free circulation either in the EU or in Turkey, which means that the product had gone through the importation procedure in either country.

See also
 ATA Carnet
 Certificate of Origin
 EUR.1 movement certificate
 Form A
 Form B
 TIR Carnet

External links
 TBCCI: Frequently Asked Questions

Foreign trade of Turkey